Sérgio Miguel Relvas de Oliveira  (born 2 June 1992) is a Portuguese professional footballer who plays as a central midfielder for Süper Lig club Galatasaray and the Portugal national team.

He spent the better part of his career with Porto after making his first-team debut at the age of 17, going on to appear in 174 competitive matches and win three Primeira Liga championships, three Taça de Portugal and two Supertaça Cândido de Oliveira. He was also loaned to Beira-Mar, Mechelen, Penafiel, Nantes, PAOK and Roma, winning another double with PAOK in the 2018–19 season and the Europa Conference League with Roma in 2022. In the Portuguese top division, he also represented Paços de Ferreira.

Oliveira finished second at the 2015 European Under-21 Championship with Portugal. He made his senior debut in 2018, being part of the squad at Euro 2020.

Club career

Porto
Born in Paços de Brandão, Santa Maria da Feira, Aveiro District, Oliveira arrived at FC Porto's youth system in 2002, at the age of 10. On 17 October 2009, he became the club's youngest ever player to appear for the first team, at the age of 17 years, four months and 15 days, in a 4–0 home win against Sertanense F.C. in the third round of the Taça de Portugal; during the game, he provided an assist for Hulk in one of the goals. The following month, he signed a renewed contract, running until June 2012 with a €30 million buyout clause.

Oliveira was loaned to S.C. Beira-Mar of the Primeira Liga for the 2010–11 campaign. He made his debut in the competition on 23 October 2010, playing one minute in a 1–1 away draw with F.C. Paços de Ferreira.

In the summer of 2011, still owned by Porto, Oliveira was deemed surplus to requirements by new manager Vítor Pereira as practically all Portuguese players, and joined Belgian Pro League club K.V. Mechelen. He scored his first career goals on 21 September in the sixth round of the national cup away to K.V. Oostende, two in a 3–0 victory; his one goal of the league season was a consolation in a 3–2 loss at Standard Liège on 25 November. In the following transfer window, in the same situation, he returned to his country and signed for F.C. Penafiel in the second division.

Paços Ferreira
Oliveira agreed to a three-year contract with Paços de Ferreira for 2013–14, also in the Portuguese top tier. In each of his two seasons, he scored twice in the league.

Return to Porto
After having been sold back to Porto before the start of the 2015–16 campaign, Oliveira scored his first competitive goal for the side on 3 February 2016, helping to a 3–0 away defeat of Gil Vicente F.C. in the semi-finals of the domestic cup. Late into the 2017 January transfer window, he was loaned to FC Nantes as the French side was coached by compatriot Sérgio Conceição, who subsequently would be his boss at Porto.

Oliveira was a very important unit for the 2017–18 national champions, first rising to prominence after a remarkable performance against AS Monaco FC in the group stage of the UEFA Champions League. His importance grew even further as he spent the final stretch of the season as a starter, forming a revamped midfield partnership with Héctor Herrera after Danilo Pereira suffered a serious injury which ruled him out for several months.

Oliveira still took the field in the 2018 edition of the Supertaça Cândido de Oliveira, a 3–1 victory over C.D. Aves. On 31 January 2019, having ceased to be part of Conceição's plans, he joined PAOK FC on a five-month loan deal. On 18 February, he contributed to a 5–1 Super League Greece rout at Apollon Smyrnis F.C. for his first goal. He added two more the following month in wins against Atromitos FC (3–0) and Xanthi FC (2–1), and eventually helped the club conquer the double for the first time in its history.

In the 2019–20 campaign, Oliveira played 34 games in all competitions and scored five times to win another double, edging S.L. Benfica on both domestic fronts. In the final of the Portuguese Cup, he came on as an 80th-minute substitute for Jesús Corona as his team (reduced to ten men since the end of the first half) held on to a 2–1 victory in Coimbra.

Oliveira achieved a career-best 20 goals in 2020–21. On 9 March 2021, he scored a brace in a 3–2 loss after extra-time to Juventus F.C. in the Champions League round of 16 – an early penalty and a 115th-minute free kick – to qualify his team on the away goals rule. Consequently, he was given the "Dragão de Ouro" award for Porto's footballer of the year.

Subsequently, Oliveira attracted interest from clubs such as ACF Fiorentina, A.S. Roma and Tottenham Hotspur. As the summer transfer window closed, no moves materialised, and he began the 2021–22 season on the bench, as fellow youth graduate Bruno Costa who had just been re-signed started in his place. However, after scoring a late winner in a 2–1 league victory against Gil Vicente, he returned to the starting eleven.

Loan to Roma
On 12 January 2022, Oliveira joined Serie A club Roma, coached by his compatriot José Mourinho; the €1 million loan deal included a €13.5 million buying option at the end of the campaign. He scored on his debut four days later, his 33rd-minute penalty being the only goal of the home fixture with Cagliari Calcio. He made six appearances as the Giallorossi won the inaugural edition of the UEFA Europa Conference League, and scored the only goal in the last-16 first leg away to SBV Vitesse in which he was also sent off; he replaced the injured Henrikh Mkhitaryan after a quarter of an hour in the final on 25 May in another single-goal win over a Dutch side, Feyenoord.

Galatasaray
On 9 July 2022, Galatasaray S.K. announced the signing of Oliveira on a four-year contract. He made his Süper Lig debut on 7 August, starting as the season began with a 1–0 win at Antalyaspor. His first goal came on 16 September to open a 2–1 home victory over Konyaspor in 59 seconds.

International career
Oliveira was selected by the Portugal under-19 team for the 2010 UEFA European Championship; in the tournament in France, he scored in a 2–0 group stage victory over Italy as both nations went on to be eliminated after the first three games. He was also part of the under-20 side at the 2011 FIFA World Cup in Colombia, finishing in second place.

Oliveira was the captain of the under-21s at the 2015 European Championship in the Czech Republic. He hit the crossbar in the first half of the final against Sweden, and was replaced as they went on to lose in a penalty shootout after a 0–0 draw in Prague.

Oliveira was selected by full side manager Fernando Santos to a preliminary 35-man squad for the 2018 FIFA World Cup, but he did not make the final cut. He won his first cap on 6 September of that year, replacing William Carvalho for the final ten minutes of a 1–1 friendly draw with Croatia in São João da Venda, Algarve. His maiden competitive appearance took place four days later, when he came on for the same player late into a 1–0 win over Italy for the UEFA Nations League.

On 20 May 2021, Oliveira was named in the squad for UEFA Euro 2020. He made his debut in the competition on 23 June, in a 2–2 draw against France which closed the group stage.

In October 2022, Oliveira was included in a preliminary 55-man squad for the 2022 World Cup in Qatar.

Personal life
Oliveira married Cristiana Gonçalves Pereira at Porto's Church of Our Lady of Lapa in June 2019. He thanked Julen Lopetegui for leaving him on the Estádio do Dragão bench when the Spaniard was manager in 2015–16, as it was there that he met his wife.

Career statistics

Club

International

Honours

Club
Porto
Primeira Liga: 2017–18, 2019–20, 2021–22  
Taça de Portugal: 2009–10, 2019–20, 2021–22
Supertaça Cândido de Oliveira: 2018, 2020

PAOK
Super League Greece: 2018–19
Greek Football Cup: 2018–19

Roma
UEFA Europa Conference League: 2021–22

International
Portugal U20
FIFA U-20 World Cup runner-up: 2011

Portugal U21
UEFA European Under-21 Championship runner-up: 2015

Individual
Primeira Liga Team of the Year: 2020–21
UEFA Champions League Squad of the Season: 2020–21
FC Porto Player of the Year: 2020–21

Orders
 Knight of the Order of Prince Henry

References

External links

1992 births
Living people
Sportspeople from Santa Maria da Feira
Portuguese footballers
Association football midfielders
Primeira Liga players
Liga Portugal 2 players
FC Porto players
Padroense F.C. players
S.C. Beira-Mar players
F.C. Penafiel players
FC Porto B players
F.C. Paços de Ferreira players
Belgian Pro League players
K.V. Mechelen players
Ligue 1 players
FC Nantes players
Super League Greece players
PAOK FC players
Serie A players
A.S. Roma players
Süper Lig players
Galatasaray S.K. footballers
UEFA Europa Conference League winning players
Portugal youth international footballers
Portugal under-21 international footballers
Portugal international footballers
UEFA Euro 2020 players
Olympic footballers of Portugal
Footballers at the 2016 Summer Olympics
Portuguese expatriate footballers
Expatriate footballers in Belgium
Expatriate footballers in France
Expatriate footballers in Greece
Expatriate footballers in Italy
Expatriate footballers in Turkey
Portuguese expatriate sportspeople in Belgium
Portuguese expatriate sportspeople in France
Portuguese expatriate sportspeople in Greece
Portuguese expatriate sportspeople in Italy
Portuguese expatriate sportspeople in Turkey